The Grouch may refer to:

The Grouch (play) or Dyskolos, a 4th-century B.C. comedy by the Greek dramatist Menander
The Grouch (rapper) (born 1975), American rapper and producer
Grouch (video game), a 2000 action-adventure game
"The Grouch", a song by Green Day from Nimrod
Oscar the Grouch, a character on Sesame Street
 Grouches, a fictional race of creatures on Sesame Street
Brummbär (German for "Grouch"), the Allies' name for the Sturmpanzer 43, a German World War II armoured infantry support gun